Hotel Carlton is a boutique hotel on Nob Hill in San Francisco which has been operating since 1927. It is operated by Joie de Vivre Hospitality.

It is a contributing property to the Lower Nob Hill Apartment Hotel District, which was listed on the National Register of Historic Places in 1991.

It is particularly known for the significant ownership interest which, as of 2015, California Senator Dianne Feinstein and husband Richard C. Blum hold in it.

The Hotel Carlton was the permanent place of residence of the character Paladin, the lead character in the TV Western "Have Gun - Will Travel."

References 

Hotels in San Francisco
Historic district contributing properties in California